Baron Arklow was a title in the Peerage of the United Kingdom that has been created twice. Arklow is a town in County Wicklow in Ireland.

History

First creation, 1801
It was created first in 1801 as a substantive title by King George III for his son Prince Augustus Frederick. Augustus Frederick was also created Duke of Sussex and Earl of Inverness, on the same day. The title became extinct upon Prince Augustus Frederick's death in 1843.

Although Prince Augustus Frederick was survived by a son and daughter by Lady Augusta Murray, their marriage (purportedly solemnized at St George's Hanover Square Church, Westminster, in 1793) had been annulled for lack of royal permission under the Royal Marriages Act 1772, rendering the children illegitimate under English law and unable to inherit titles from their father. Both children by the annulled marriage died childless, rendering the issue of their inheritance moot.

On 2 May 1831, Prince Augustus Frederick married secondly (and again in contravention of the Royal Marriages Act 1772), Lady Cecilia Gore at Great Cumberland Place, London. Not being the Prince's legitimate wife, Lady Cecilia could not be received at court. On 30 March 1840, she was given the title of Duchess of Inverness in her own right by Queen Victoria.

Second creation, 1881
The second creation in 1881, as a substantive title by Queen Victoria for her son Prince Leopold. Leopold was also created Duke of Albany and Earl of Clarence, on the same day. Prince Leopold's son, Prince Charles Edward (who had succeeded as reigning Duke of Saxe-Coburg and Gotha in 1900), was deprived of the peerage in 1919 for bearing arms against the United Kingdom in World War I.

Baron Arklow, first Creation (1801)

| Prince Augustus FrederickHouse of Hanover1801–1843 also: Duke of Sussex and Earl of Inverness (1801)
| 
| 27 January 1773Buckingham House, Londonson of King George III and Queen Charlotte
| 4 April 1793 Lady Augusta Murray2 children2 May 1831Lady Cecilia UnderwoodNo children
| 21 April 1843Kensington Palace, Londonaged 70
|-
| colspan=5|Prince Augustus' marriage to Lady Augusta Murray, which produced two children, was invalid under the Royal Marriages Act 1772; accordingly all his titles became extinct on his death.
|-
|}

Baron Arklow, second Creation (1881)

| Prince LeopoldHouse of Saxe-Coburg and Gotha1882–1884also: Duke of Albany and Earl of Clarence (1881)
| 
| 7 April 1853Buckingham Palace, Londonson of Queen Victoria and Prince Albert
| Princess Helena of Waldeck and Pyrmont27 April 18822 children
| 28 March 1884Villa Nevada, Cannesaged 30
|-
| Prince Charles EdwardHouse of Saxe-Coburg and Gotha1884–1919also: Duke of Albany and Earl of Clarence (1881)
| 
| 19 July 1884Claremont, Esherson of Prince Leopold and Princess Helena
| Princess Victoria Adelaide of Schleswig-Holstein11 October 19055 children
| 6 March 1954Coburgaged 69
|-
|colspan=5|The Titles Deprivation Act 1917 suspended the title on 28 March 1919.
|-
|}

References

 
Extinct baronies in the Peerage of the United Kingdom
Noble titles created in 1801
Noble titles created in 1881